Deer Lake Airport  is located  north of Deer Lake, Ontario, Canada.

Airlines and destinations

See also
 Deer Lake Water Aerodrome
 Deer Lake/Keyamawun Water Aerodrome

References

Certified airports in Kenora District